Bexhill Hospital is a National Health Service hospital at Bexhill-on-Sea in East Sussex. It is managed by the East Sussex Healthcare NHS Trust.

History
Following a successful fund-raising campaign chaired by Admiral Charles Eustace Anson in the late 1920s, the hospital was built on Holliers Hill and officially opened by Princess Helena Victoria in 1933. The hospital site received four direct hits from German Luftwaffe bombs on one occasion during the Second World War. It joined the National Health Service in 1948.

References

Hospitals in East Sussex
NHS hospitals in England
Bexhill-on-Sea